The 1993 NCAA Division III women's basketball tournament was the 12th annual tournament hosted by the NCAA to determine the national champion of Division III women's collegiate basketball in the United States.

Central College defeated Capital in the championship game, 71–63, to claim the Dutch's first Division III national title. 

The championship rounds were hosted by Central College in Pella, Iowa.

Bracket

Final Four

All-tournament team
 Sandy Buddelmeyer, Capital
 Katie Geiger, Scranton
 Emilie Hanson, Central
 Tina Kampa, Saint Benedict
 Chris Rogers, Central (IA)

See also
 1993 NCAA Division III men's basketball tournament
 1993 NCAA Division I women's basketball tournament
 1993 NCAA Division II women's basketball tournament
 1993 NAIA Division I women's basketball tournament
 1993 NAIA Division II women's basketball tournament

References

 
NCAA Division III women's basketball tournament
1993 in sports in Iowa